Willy Schneider (20 October 1929 – 31 January 2022) was a Swiss sprinter. He competed in the men's 100 metres at the 1952 Summer Olympics.

References

External links
 

1929 births
2022 deaths
Athletes (track and field) at the 1952 Summer Olympics
Swiss male sprinters
Olympic athletes of Switzerland
Place of birth missing